Audioblog is a blog with vocal recordings as its central part, and may refer to:
 Podcast, a type of digital media consisting of an episodic series of files (either audio or video) subscribed to and downloaded through web syndication
 MP3 blog or musicblog, through which music files are made available for download